The cycling competition at the 2005 Mediterranean Games was a men-only competition. Track events were absent from the programme and the only two events were an individual time trial and an individual road race.

Men's competition

Individual Time Trial
Held on Wednesday June 29, 2005 over 28 kilometres

Individual Road Race
Held on Saturday July 2, 2005 over 141 kilometres

Medal table

References
Results

Mediterranean Games
Sports at the 2005 Mediterranean Games
2005
Med
2005 in road cycling